Toxic Man is a 2018 Burmese action-thriller film, directed by Steel (Dwe Myittar) starring Nine Nine, Khar Ra, Tun Ko Ko and Shwe Thamee. The film, produced by Golden Hour Film Production premiered in Myanmar on November 30, 2018.

Cast
Nine Nine as Zaw Htike
Khar Ra as  Aung Myat
Tun Ko Ko as Police Officer
Shwe Thamee as Tharaphi

References

External links

2018 films
2010s Burmese-language films
2018 action thriller films
Films shot in Myanmar
Burmese action thriller films